The Pepperdine Waves women's basketball team is the basketball team that represents Pepperdine University in Malibu, California, United States. The school's team currently competes in the West Coast Conference. The team's last appearance in the NCAA Division I women's basketball tournament was in 2006. Their home arena is the Firestone Fieldhouse, a multi-purpose facility that hosts basketball, volleyball, and many other athletic and university events. They share this facility with the Pepperdine Waves men's basketball team.

Postseason Results
The Waves have made the NCAA Tournament four times (2000, 2002, 2003, 2006) and the WNIT six times (1999, 2001, 2004, 2010, 2011, 2019). As of the end of the 2015–16 season, the Waves have an all-time record of 622–579.

NCAA tournament results 
The Waves have appeared in the NCAA tournament four times.

NIT results 
The Waves have appeared in the National Invitation Tournament (WNIT) six times. Most recently in 2019 they made it to the Sweet Sixteen of the Women's National Invitational Tournament.

AIAW College Division/Division II
The Waves made two appearances in the AIAW National Division II basketball tournament, with a combined record of 1–2.

References

External links
 Official website